Naranbhai Bhikhabhai Kachhadia (born 25 April 1955) is an Indian politician who is a member of the Lok Sabha, the lower house of the Parliament of India.  He was elected to the Amreli constituency of Gujarat in 2009. He is a member of the Bharatiya Janata Party.

References

External links
 Official biographical sketch in Parliament of India website

Living people
India MPs 2009–2014
1955 births
Bharatiya Janata Party politicians from Gujarat
Lok Sabha members from Gujarat
India MPs 2014–2019
People from Amreli district
India MPs 2019–present